André Marcel Charles Casanova (12 October 1919 – 7 March 2009) was a French composer. He was an early disciple of René Leibowitz, a teacher and composer who maintained a strict adherence to the dodecaphonic musical theories of Arnold Schoenberg.  Casanova later abandoned most of them in favour of a more classical style of composition. His published works, composed between 1944 and 1993, include orchestral, chamber and choral music, operas and songs.

Life and career
Casanova was born in Paris, and studied law there, while at the same time studying music with Georges Dandelot at the École Normale de Musique de Paris. In 1944 he became the first French pupil of René Leibowitz, with whom he studied theory and composition. Leibowitz introduced him to dodecaphonic and serial composition. Together with other Leibowitz pupils, Serge Nigg, Antoine Duhamel and Jean Prodromidès, he gave the first performance of Leibowitz's Explications des Metaphors, Op. 15, in Paris in 1948.

Thereafter, according to the Grove Dictionary of Music and Musicians, Casanova's concern was "to ally a romantic spirit with modernity of style". in the mid-1950s he abandoned dodecaphony, although he retained some of its chromatic elements for harmonic purposes. After his avant-garde period, Casanova returned to what Grove calls "a more classical conception of both style and form". In 1959 his Concertino, for piano and chamber orchestra, was performed as a French contribution at the 33rd annual music festival of the International Society for Contemporary Music. In 1960 he received an award from the Queen Marie José Music Foundation for his Cavalier seul, a chamber cantata for baritone and string quartet (later revised for voice and string orchestra), dedicated to Hans Werner Henze.

In the late 1940s there had been some hostility between adherents of Leibowitz and those of the teacher and composer Olivier Messiaen, but so far as Casanova was concerned any breach had healed sufficiently during the 1950s for Messiaen's partner Yvonne Loriod to play the solo part at the premiere of Casanova's piano concertino in 1959. He developed an interest in German Romantic literature and with Nietzsche's philosophy, which is reflected in his work. His Third Symphony (Dithyrambes, 1964) has a vocal part, with words by Nietzsche, taken from Dionysos-Dithyramben set in the original German.

In his later years Casanova lived at Louveciennes on the fringe of Paris, where he died on  7 March 2009, at the age of 89.

Works

Orchestral works

Symphony No 1, 1949 
Symphony No 2, Op. 7, 1952 rev 1959
Concertino for piano and chamber orchestra, Op. 8, 1952 rev 1958 and 1962
Ballade for clarinet and chamber orchestra, Op. 9, 1955 
Notturno for orchestra, Op. 13 ("In memoriam Richard Strauss"), 1959 
Capriccio for oboe and strings, Op. 16, 1960 
Anamorphoses for orchestra, Op. 17 (dedicated to the memory of Max Reger), 1962
Impromptus for orchestra, 1963 
Suite for strings, 1964 
Symphony No 3 Dithyrambes, with tenor solo, 1964 
Concerto for violin and orchestra, 1963 (Dedicated to Gerd Albrecht)  
Suite for string orchestra, 1965
Concerto for trumpet and string orchestra, 1966 
Strophes for orchestra Op 33, 1968 
Prelude, Op. 34 for string orchestra, 1968
Fantaisie for French horn, string orchestra and marimbaphone, 1968 

Concerto for oboe harp brass and percussion, 1968
Musique concertante for cor anglais and orchestra, 1969
Alternances, Op. 41, 1971
Concerto for organ and orchestra, 1972 
Recitatifs for orchestra Op 48, 1973 
Guitar Concerto, 1973
Épisodes pour cordes avec violon principal, Op. 47, 1974
Partita pour ensemble orchestral, Op. 65, 1979
Piano Concerto, 1981
Violin Concerto, 1982
Métaphonie, 1982
Ein Musikalisches Opfer, Op. 70 ("À la mémoire d'Ottorino Respighi"), 1971
Ephemeris. op. 81 ("À la mémoire d'Alexander Glazunov"), 1989
Symphony No 4, 1992
Symphony No 5, 1993

Chamber

3 pieces for piano, 1944
Trio for flute, viola and horn/bass clarinet, 1946
Duo for clarinet and bassoon, 1950
4 Bagatelles for wind quintet, 1955 
Elégie for piano trio, 1956
Humoresque for flute and clarinet, 1957
Trio for strings, 1966 
Serenata for flute and ensemble, Op. 26, 1966
String Quartet No 1, Op. 27, 1967 
4 Intermezzi for piano, Op. 28, 1967
3 momenti for brass quintet, Op. 37, 1968
Quintet for piano and winds, Op. 39, 1970 
Trio for piano-violin-cello, Op.43, 1972 

5 Little Pieces for cello, Op.45, 1972
Due canzoni for alto saxophone, clarinet, trumpet, percussion, organ and bass guitar, Op. 49, 1973
Sextet for clarinet, string quartet and double bass, Op. 63, 1983 
Septet for clarinet, bassoon, horn, violin, viola, cello and double bass, Op. 72, 1985
String Quartet No 2, 1985 
String Quartet No 3, Op. 73, 1985 
Piccolo studio for bassoon and piano, 1986
Six évocations for flute, clarinet, violin, cello and piano, Op. 76, 1987
Quintet for strings, 1988 
Sonata for violin and piano, 1988 
String Quartet No 4, 1990 
String Quartet No 5, 1991 
String Quartet No 6, 1992

Choral and song

3 mélodies, for soprano and piano, 1945
Divertimento, Op 10, 1953
Cavalier seul for baritone and string quartet, 1959 (arr for baritone and string orchestra, 1964)
Redoutes for baritone and orchestra, 1962
Le livre de la foi jurée, after La chanson de Roland, for speaker, soprano, bariton and orchestra, 1964
Le chant d'Aude for soprano and string orchestra, 1965 
Règnes, for soprano and orchestra, Op. 29, "In memoriam Jean Cocteau", 1967
3 poèmes de Rilke for chorus, 1968

5 mélodies for tenor and chamber orchestra, 1968
3 sonnets de Louise Labé, for soprano and piano, 1972
Rituels, Op.46, for baritone and ensemble, 1972
Deux fragments d'Algabal de Stefan George for mezzo-soprano, clarinet, bassoon, vibraphone and cello, Op. 52, 1973
Sur les chemins d'acanthes noires,  cantata for reciter, baritone, male choir, and orchestraon solo choeur d'hommes et orchestre, Op. 55, 1974
Quatre dizains de la Délie de Scève, Op. 61, 1978
Esquisses pour une tragédie, Op. 64, 1979
Deutsche Gesänge, 1980

Stage works
La clé d'argent, conte lyrique, in one act. Text by Jean Moal after Villiers de l'Isle-Adam, 1965
Le livre de la foi juree, geste lyrique, 1965 
Le bonheur dans le crime, opera in a prologue and three acts. Text by Bernard George after the novel by Jules Barbey d'Aurevilly, 1969 
La coupe d'or,  opera in one act. Text by Jean Moal after Ludwig Tieck, 1970 
Notturno, ballet, 1972

Notes and sources

Notes

Sources
 

1919 births
2009 deaths
Musicians from Paris
École Normale de Musique de Paris alumni
French male classical composers
French opera composers
Male opera composers
20th-century French male musicians